Saidina Uthman Bin Affan Mosque is a mosque in Bandar Tun Razak near Cheras, Kuala Lumpur, Malaysia. This mosque was opened on 1988 by the eighth Yang di-Pertuan Agong, Sultan Iskandar of Johor. It was named after Muhammad's third Caliph (successor), Uthman Bin Affan.

See also
 Islam in Malaysia

Mosques in Kuala Lumpur
Mosques completed in 1988